Pluck was an American Internet company based in Austin, Texas, that ran a website since 2005 that offered an RSS reader. The company was acquired by Demand Media on March 3, 2008 for US$75 million in cash.

References

External links 
 Official website

Internet properties established in 2005
2008 mergers and acquisitions